The 2003 IIHF World Championship was held between 26 April and 11 May 2003 in Helsinki, Tampere and Turku, Finland.

It was the 67th annual event, and was run by the International Ice Hockey Federation (IIHF).

Canada won the gold medal after defeating Sweden 3–2 in a tightly fought final. Over 14 minutes into the overtime, Canadian forward Anson Carter beat Swedish goaltender Mikael Tellqvist with a wraparound goal. The goal was contested for several minutes before replays confirmed that Tellqvist had stopped the puck behind the goal line. It was Canada's first World Championship win in five years.

Sweden surrendered five consecutive goals against Finland in their quarterfinal to trail 5–1 seven minutes into the second period, at which point Swedish goaltender Tommy Salo was swapped for Mikael Tellqvist. This proved to be the Swedish team's necessary wake-up call as the Swedes went on to score five unanswered goals before the end of regulation and ultimately win the game 6–5.

Qualification Tournament

The Far Eastern Qualification was played as a single game during the 2003 Asian Winter Games on February 4, 2003 in Hachinohe, Japan.   South Korea had opted to not play as they believed it more beneficial to focus on training and developing for their Division II tournament.  During the games Japan also beat the Koreans eleven to two in the semi-finals.

All times local

Venues

Final tournament

First round

In the first round, the top 3 teams from each group progressed to the second round, whilst the last placed team progressed to the consolation round.

Group A

All times local

Group B

All times local

Group C

All times local

Group D

All times local

Second round

In the Second Round, the top 4 teams from each group progressed to the Final Round, whilst the bottom 2 teams are eliminated.

Group E

Tables and scores below include meetings between teams during the First Round.

Group F

Tables and scores below include meetings between teams during the First Round.

Consolation round 13-16 place

Group G

As the Far Eastern qualifier,  avoids relegation.

All times local

Final round

Quarterfinals

Semifinals

Match for third place

Final

Ranking and statistics

Tournament awards
Best players selected by the directorate:
Best Goaltender:       Sean Burke
Best Defenceman:       Jay Bouwmeester
Best Forward:          Mats Sundin
Most Valuable Player:  Mats Sundin
Media All-Star Team:
Goaltender:  Sean Burke
Defence:  Jay Bouwmeester,  Ľubomír Višňovský
Forwards:  Peter Forsberg,  Dany Heatley,  Mats Sundin

Final standings
The final standings of the tournament according to IIHF:

Scoring leaders
List shows the top ten skaters sorted by points, then goals, then (fewer) games played.
Source: IIHF.com

Leading goaltenders
Only the top five goaltenders, based on save percentage, who have played 40% of their team's minutes are included in this list.
Source: IIHF.com

See also
IIHF World Championship

References

Official tournament site
Far east qualifier site

External links
 

 
IIHF World Championship
1
World championships
World
2003
International sports competitions in Helsinki
April 2003 sports events in Europe
May 2003 sports events in Europe
2000s in Helsinki
2000s in Turku
International sports competitions in Turku
Sports competitions in Tampere